Lieutenant-General Sir Edmund Fortescue Gerard Burton KBE (born 20 October 1943) is a former British Army officer who became Deputy Chief of the Defence Staff (Systems).

Military career
Educated at Cheltenham College and Trinity Hall, Cambridge, Burton was commissioned into the Royal Artillery in 1963. He served as commanding officer of 27 Regiment RA before become Commander, Royal Artillery for 1st (UK) Armoured Division in 1987. He became military attaché in Washington D. C. in 1990, Commandant of the Royal Military College of Science in 1991 and Assistant Chief of the Defence Staff Operational Requirements (Land) in 1994. He went on to be Deputy Chief of the Defence Staff (Systems) in 1997 and retired in 2000.

Later career
In retirement he became chairman of the former Police Information Technology Organisation, and was the Chairman of the Information Assurance Advisory Council for many years, until March 2017.

He remains the Chair of the Advisory Committee on Trustworthy Software (ACTS).

References

|-

1943 births
British Army lieutenant generals
Knights Commander of the Order of the British Empire
Royal Artillery officers
Living people
Alumni of Trinity Hall, Cambridge
People educated at Cheltenham College
British military attachés